The Berkshire Trophy is the amateur stroke play golf championship played at The Berkshire Golf Club in England. It has been played annually since 1946. The format is 72 hole stroke play contested over two days. Both the Blue and Red courses are used on the Saturday with the leading 40 scores and ties going through to play two further rounds on the Red course on the Sunday. If two or more players are tied after 72 holes they share the trophy; there is no playoff.

The player with the lowest combined aggregate over the Brabazon and Berkshire Trophies is awarded the "Philip Scrutton Jug".

Winners

Source:

References

Amateur golf tournaments in the United Kingdom
Golf tournaments in England
1946 establishments in England
Recurring sporting events established in 1946